" and be there" is an expression popularly used by photographers to indicate the importance of taking the opportunity for a picture rather than being too concerned about using the best technique. Often attributed to the noir-style New York City photographer Weegee, it has come to represent a philosophy in which, on occasion, action is more important than reflection.

Background
Before digital photography, in what Kathy Day called the "heyday of photojournalism, before auto-focus and pixels", spot photography (known to contemporaries as "moment photography") was popular. This attempted to epitomise an entire visual story through a single photograph taken either as the event was occurring or immediately after. Situations that lent themselves particularly well to this approach were criminal activity (particularly that of the Mafia and organised crime) and accidents and car crashes.

Weegee
The expression has been attributed—probably apocryphally—to the American photographer Arthur Fellig, more popularly known as Weegee, who has been described as "the famous spot news photographer of the mid-20th century". Known for stark black and white—"searing chiaroscuro"—photography, Weegee used a "big, flash-popping Speed Graphic" although Terry Teachout has suggested that he probably used ƒ/16, that being the lowest aperture in general use.

Philosophy
The philosophy has been explained thus:

Effectively it emphasises less reliance on high technology and more reliance on average settings and personal skill, as well as portraying the story accurately and graphically.

It is akin, says the photographer Douglas Peebles, in its simplicity and obviousness to the advice "if you want to be famous for photographing famous people, begin by photographing famous people". It is being there, said "that predisposes luck in the photographer's favour". 
The Encyclopedia of International Media and Communications has suggested that while the "ƒ/8 and be there" tactic was sensationalist, it was also, by the same token, more likely to win the photographer awards.

It epitomises the popularity of lurid newspaper reports which were giving tabloids extremely large circulations and also how journalism was increasingly being influenced by the theatrics of Hollywood. The photography author Ken Kobre has summed it up as "check human tragedy first. Concentrate on the human element of any tragedy. Readers relate to people pictures."

Specs
ƒ/8 is considered in photography to be a general-purpose aperture ("that never fails", commented the magazine editor Richard Stolley in 2009). With the aperture set to ƒ/8 (allowing sufficient light to enter for exposure but not so much as to bleach the picture) and the lens set to the hyperfocal distance—which results in a sharply-focussed depth of field whether taking pictures up close or at great distances. ƒ/8 allows sufficient depth of field and lens speed for good, clear exposure in most daylight situations.

Cultural touchstone
The expression, wrote Michigan Daily photojournalist Andy Sacks, summed up "everything a successful news photographer needed to know". It has been particularly advocated for street and outdoor photography, particularly mountain stereography and wildlife. It has also become a mantra for non-photography disciplines and hobbies, for example self-help philosophies.

Notes

References

Sources

 
 
 
 
 
 
 
 
 
  
 
 
 
 
 
 
 
 
 
 
 
 

Science of photography
Culture of New York City